= Unión Atlético Venezuela =

Argentinian football club

Unión Atlético Venezuela is a football club based in Argentina.

== History ==
Unión Atlético Venezuela was founded in 2019.
